is a manga series written by Wataru Yoshizumi. The romantic comedy series features 8th  grader Ayu Tateishi, a tennis club member, and her transfer student friend, Nina Sakura, who is actually a trainee witch from the magical kingdom. It premiered in Shueisha's Ribon manga magazine in February 2001 and ran until January 2004. It was also published in five collected volumes by Shueisha. Viz Media licensed and released an English translation of the series in North America.

The series was first adapted into a 20-minute anime OVA, released August 6, 2002. Later, it was also adapted into a 26-episode anime television series. Both were produced by Ashi Productions and Animax. The anime series premiered on May 20, 2003 in Japan on Animax, and was later licensed for Region 1 distribution by Geneon Entertainment.

Plot

Ayu Tateishi is a well-adjusted middle-schooler in her second year, until the fateful day when she finds a dejected looking Nina Sakura outside of the school. Nina explains that she lost something very dear to her earlier that day. Ayu offers to help Nina, the annoying girl look for her lost item, but Nina seems reluctant to say what the item is that she lost, and runs off. On her way home Ayu finds what seems to be a mini-computer underneath the bench she knew Nina to be at earlier that day. After returning the item to Nina, Nina struggles to decide whether to let Ayu in on the 'big secret' she keeps.

In order to see if Ayu is trustworthy, she starts to follow Ayu around and eventually decides she can trust Ayu. Nina reveals that she is actually from the Magic Kingdom and is a magic girl. Ayu, however, doesn't believe Nina and thinks she is a bit crazy at first. Ayu herself had always shunned the ideas of magic and fairy tales, even admitting she had never read Harry Potter, so having someone tell her they are a witch truly isn't something she can easily accept. After several mishaps with her magic, Nina proves she is a magic girl, and a failure who came to Earth as her last chance to prove that she can get things right. These first mishaps and the fact that Nina has shared her secret with Ayu, Nina attaches herself to Ayu as a friend and does everything she can to help Ayu with getting the attention of her crush, Tetsushi Kaji. As their adventures continue many friends from the Magic Kingdom come and visit Nina to the chagrin of Ayu.

The anime adaptation has a very different plot starting after Ayu and Nina have first met.  Instead of coming as a witch failure who is trying to prove herself to be more than she is said to be, Nina has come to Earth to find the five "Holy Stones". She tells Ayu that whoever collects all five will qualify to marry the prince of the Magic Kingdom. Nina's childhood friend Maya is also on Earth from the start, competing with Nina to find the stones.  Though Nina does collect them all first, she learns that the prince and Maya are truly in love with one another, so Nina gives up the stones and her dream, allowing Maya and the prince to be with one another, and Nina stays on Earth with her friends.

Characters

Ayu Tateishi constantly tries to stay calm and keep her cool about everything. This is quite a facade for her to keep up, because the only reason she wants to be "cool" is because Tetsushi Kaji (her crush, and later on her boyfriend) told her once that he liked how cool she was about everything. He said this because when their class was given a pop quiz she was the only one in the class who didn't freak out (she was actually just tired). However, after Ayu meets Nina, she is everything but cool and calm. She is the president of the girls' tennis club and one of the most popular girls in the school, and she works hard on keeping up her "cool, calm and collected" reputation.

Nina Sakura's first scene is when Ayu Tateishi finds her crying because she lost a small, pink "box." Later, when Ayu finds and returns the box to her, Nina realizes that she has found a perfect person to reveal her strange secret to. She later reveals it to Hiroki Tsujiai, who, in the manga, later becomes her boyfriend. In the anime, she is often seen trying to help Ayu with her love life. She'll do absolutely anything to ensure that her friends are happy, even if it means suffering a little grief herself. Nina is very peppy and perky, and she loves sweets. She also enjoys manga.  In the anime, her real name is Nina Saqurail, and near the end, the last of the five holy stones are unleashed when she and Tsujiai reach to each other in the Dark Zone.

Considered an idol by the girls and a role model to the boys in his school, Tetsushi appears to be cool and always has a nice smile, but that's just his outer shell. In reality, Tetsushi is a normal person who doesn't even like being an idol. He only acts like "Prince Charming" because Ayu stated once that she liked him that way (Ayu acted "cool" for the same reason). He later explains to Nina that he's being "the nice guy" because of Ayu and that he worked hard for the title. Nina has a crush on Tetsushi during the second volume of the manga, but she forgets her original feelings for him when she sees how happy Ayu is to be with him. In both the manga and anime, he and Ayu eventually begin dating.

Tetsushi's best friend, who is often seen together with him. He is the head of the boys' tennis club. He is a fan of many manga and has similar taste with Nina. He is very steadfast and has a good sense of self-worth. Hiroki is in love with Nina, and he and Nina start to go out with each other mid-way through the manga.  They continue to date up to the end of the series.

Yuta is from the Magic Kingdom, and he and Nina are childhood friends. He is adept enough with magic that he doesn't need a computer to cast spells like Nina does, and teases her about that frequently. He has a kind heart. At first, Yuta appears to show affection for Ayu, but, as Ayu later discovers, he is actually crazy about Nina. In the last episode of the anime, Yuta appears to have some feelings for Luna, but in the manga, he falls in love with Sayaka and goes out with her until the series ends.

Nina's pet cat, Leo (called "Rio" in the English translation of the anime) can change into the form of a little boy by using a magic candy. In the anime, all he has to do is a flip and he becomes human. In the anime, he starts to like Ayu's dog, Tamako.

One of the candidates to be the princess of the Magic Kingdom and Nina's childhood friend. Maya has a pet chameleon named  and a talking crow named Shiro who wears an orange bandana. Her hobby is black magic. At the beginning of the story, Maya has a strong rivalry with Nina, but in episode 26, the rivalry ends. Maya has a crush on the prince, who loved her since the time when they danced together as children and she saved him. They later get married and Maya becomes princess of the Magic Kingdom. Her real name is Maya Orphelia. She does not appear in the manga, but in the epilogue chapter she is mentioned as Nina's roommate in Eltoria.

A beautiful girl at school who is known as an "ice doll" because she is frosty towards all of her classmates. She is interested in dating Yuta, but has a secret agenda. Sayaka is revealed to be half-witch on her deceased mother's side. She taught herself magic, and because she grew up on Earth, Yuta and Nina could not detect that Sayaka had magic powers. Due to bad experiences Sayaka had as a child after revealing her powers, she is envious of Nina who has so many magical and non-magical friends. Near the end, she admits her feelings for Yuta, and they get together for real. She is a manga-exclusive character.

Another character exclusive to the anime. He is the Committee Chairman at Ayu and Nina's school. He wears eyeglasses and he always takes his red camera with him. The first time around, Jun accidentally sees Nina use magic. He instantly becomes determined to expose her as a witch and is constantly trying to take pictures of her. In time, he relents. After seeing Maya, he realizes that she became a wicked witch because of her dark magic.

A manga-only character, Yuta's older sister comes to school to teach and flirt with the teachers. She takes Nina and Ayu to bars and tends to get them in trouble. In the final chapter she is dating her crush.

The Principal
A cheerful member of the school.

,  and 
A trio of little girls also called the triplets loyal to Nina. Pine looks like Blossom from The Powerpuff Girls, but with a red dress, her matching eyes and short hair tied in pigtails. Bamboo is the only tomboy of the group. She wears a blue shirt with a white "B" on it and a green cap on her head. Plum is the only one to have blond hair wearing glasses. She also wears a purple dress and her pigtails are more elegant than Pine's. All three have the ability to ride on a blue stuffed dinosaur that can use its tail as a propeller.

Media

Manga
Ultra Maniac premiered in the February 2002 issue of Ribon, with new chapters appearing monthly until its conclusion in the January 2004 issue. It was also published in five collected volumes by Shueisha.

Viz Media licensed Ultra Maniac for an English-language release in North America. The series was released from July 5, 2005 to March 7, 2006.

Volume list

Anime

The Ultra Maniac series was produced by the anime television network, Animax, who have broadcast the series exclusively across Japan, East Asia, Southeast Asia, South Asia, and other regions, dubbing and broadcasting the series into English and other languages. It has been licensed for North American distribution by Geneon Entertainment, who have released the series across the region via a 7-volume DVD release, the first of which was released on April 4, 2005 and the last of which was released on April 18, 2006.

The series was released on DVD by Discotek Media on April 25, 2017.

References

External links
 Official Animax Ultra Maniac website 
 

2001 manga
2002 anime OVAs
2003 anime television series debuts
Animax original programming
Ashi Productions
Discotek Media
Geneon USA
Romantic comedy anime and manga
Shōjo manga
Shueisha manga
Viz Media manga